Jastrzębie  is a village in the administrative district of Gmina Osieczna, within Starogard County, Pomeranian Voivodeship, in northern Poland.

For details of the history of the region, see History of Pomerania.

The village has an approximate population of 61.

References

Villages in Starogard County